Julius Caesar is a 1950 film adaptation of the Shakespeare play Julius Caesar starring Charlton Heston. The first film version of the play with sound, it was produced and directed by David Bradley using actors from the Chicago area. Heston, who had known Bradley since his youth, and who was establishing himself in television and theater in New York City, portrayed Mark Antony. He was the only paid cast member. Bradley himself played Brutus, and Harold Tasker had the titular role. Bradley recruited drama students from his alma mater Northwestern University for bit parts and extras, one of whom was future star Jeffrey Hunter, who studied alongside Heston at Northwestern.

Plot summary

Cast
 Charlton Heston as Mark Antony
 David Bradley as Brutus
 Harold Tasker as Julius Caesar
 David Bradley as Brutus
 Bob Holt as Octavius Caesar

Production
The 16 mm film was shot in 1949 on several locations around the Chicago area, including Soldier Field, the Museum of Science and Industry, the Field Museum, the downtown post office, and the Elks National Veterans Memorial. The Indiana sand dunes on Lake Michigan were used for the Battle of Philippi. One indoor set was built in the Chicago suburb of Evanston. To save money, around 80% of the film was shot silently, with the dialogue dubbed in later by the actors.

Release
After its premiere in Evanston in 1950, the film had only a limited distribution in the United States, where it was mainly shown in schools and colleges. In 1951, it played at the Edinburgh Film Festival,  then opened in New York City in late 1952. The film was shown at the Locarno International Film Festival in 1953 where it tied for first place for the first prize. On the basis of a private screening in Hollywood, Metro-Goldwyn-Mayer hired Bradley as a directing intern in 1950.

Two decades later, Heston reprised his role as Mark Antony in both Julius Caesar and Antony and Cleopatra.

Critical reception
Upon the film's opening in New York City, The New York Times credited its "company of earnest collegians" with giving "firm pictorial character" to classic drama.

See also
 List of historical drama films
 List of films set in ancient Rome
 Julius Caesar (1953 film)
 Julius Caesar (1970 film)

References

External links
 
 
 
 
 

1950 films
Films based on Julius Caesar (play)
1950s historical drama films
American historical drama films
Films directed by David Bradley
Films set in ancient Rome
Films set in the 1st century BC
Northwestern University
1950 drama films
American black-and-white films
1950s English-language films
1950s American films